Trinity is a city in Trinity County, Texas, United States. The population was 2,343 at the 2020 census.

History
Trinity was founded in 1872 on land purchased from the New York and Texas Land Company. The town was a railroad station on the Houston and Great Northern Railroad.

The town was originally named Trinity Station after the Trinity River. The name of the town was later changed to Trinity City, then to Trinity. The town was incorporated in 1910.

Civilian Conservation Corps
A camp site for Civilian Conservation Corps Company 839 was established 1.6 miles east of Trinity on June 8, 1933. The company was under the command of Captain Charles H Brammel and the medical department was under the direction of Dr H H Thornton. The field activities of the camp were mainly construction and maintenance of fire lanes, fire break roads and telephone lines.

Texas Long Leaf Lumber Company

In 1907, Thompson Brothers' Lumber Company built a mill and 37 acre pond at Trinity. Texas Long Leaf Lumber Company, which started at Willard in 1912, bought Thompson Brothers' Trinity mill in 1922. Under management of Paul Sanderson for 22 years, the company was one of the nation's most successful manufacturers of Yellow Pine and Southern Hardwoods. During World War II, production reached 140,000 board feet daily, resulting in lumber flown to Europe and Africa and the awarding of the Army-Navy "E" Award in 1944. As one of the largest employers in Trinity, the closing of the mill in 1955 had a devastating impact on the local economy.

Hardin-Sublet Gunfight
On August 7, 1872, John Wesley Hardin and Phil Sublet got into a gambling dispute at John Gates' Saloon.  The saloon was a plank structure with a bar and a ten pin alley.  After making peace, Sublet left the saloon and called out Hardin from the street south of the front door.  Hardin appeared at that door and Sublet fired one shot at him.  Hardin returned
fire not intending to kill him.  Distracted, Hardin was pulled into a middle door and Sublet wounded him with the other barrel of his shotgun. Hardin then went after him through the streets and into a dry goods store.  After a pistol malfunction, Hardin fired again and hit Sublet in the shoulder.  Too weak from his wounds, Hardin was unable to pursue him.

Geography

Trinity is located at  (30.945495, –95.375599).

According to the United States Census Bureau, the city has a total area of 3.8 square miles (9.8 km), all of it land.

Mandy Oaklander of the Houston Press said that Trinity "is a speck of a town[...]"

Milltown, a community in the periphery, housed employees of the town lumber mill. It had 208 houses, with 156 for white lumber mill workers and 52 for the black ones.

Demographics

As of the 2020 United States census, there were 2,343 people, 1,134 households, and 717 families residing in the city.

As of the census of 2000, there were 2,721 people, 1,098 households, and 703 families residing in the city. The population density was 720.2 people per square mile (277.9/km). There were 1,284 housing units at an average density of 339.9 per square mile (131.2/km). The racial makeup of the city was 57.18% White, 33.88% African American, 0.40% Native American, 0.48% Asian, 6.76% from other races, and 1.29% from two or more races. Hispanic or Latino of any race were 10.92% of the population.

There were 1,098 households, out of which 31.9% had children under the age of 18 living with them, 39.9% were married couples living together, 19.3% had a female householder with no husband present, and 35.9% were non-families. 32.1% of all households were made up of individuals, and 17.7% had someone living alone who was 65 years of age or older. The average household size was 2.48 and the average family size was 3.12.

In the city, the population was spread out, with 28.4% under the age of 18, 9.6% from 18 to 24, 23.8% from 25 to 44, 22.0% from 45 to 64, and 16.2% who were 65 years of age or older. The median age was 36 years. For every 100 females, there were 85.0 males. For every 100 females age 18 and over, there were 81.0 males.

The median income for a household in the city was $24,474, and the median income for a family was $28,678. Males had a median income of $24,470 versus $21,290 for females. The per capita income for the city was $14,320. About 15.2% of families and 24.9% of the population were below the poverty line, including 35.6% of those under age 18 and 24.4% of those age 65 or over.

Arts and culture

Old Red Schoolhouse

Completed in 1915, the Prairie Style, T-Plan building housed all grade levels until completion of an adjacent High School in 1928. "Old Red" served as a schoolhouse for 80 years. When it was slated for demolition in the 1990s, concerned citizens and former students worked with the School District to preserve the historic building for continued use.  Listed in the National Register of Historic Places by the United States Department of the Interior.

Education
The City of Trinity is served by the Trinity Independent School District. The city also has a public library named the Blanche K. Werner Public Library.

Media
The Trinity Standard newspaper is published weekly by Polk County Publishing Company. Previous newspapers included The Trinity Tribune (1894), Democracy (1901), Trinity County News (1905), The Trinity Times (1927).

Employment
Trinity was historically a lumber town and Texas Longleaf Lumber Co. was the main employer; its operations closed in 1955.

As of 2014, employment makeup of the city was; 25.8% Health Care & Social Assistance; 22.9% Retail Trade; 16.6% Accommodation & Food Services; 9.9% Educational Services; 7.3% Public Administration; 7.3% Wholesale Trade; 2.6% Professional, Scientific, & Technical Services; 2.2% Construction; 2.0% Administration & Support, Waste Management & Remediation; 1.2% Utilities; 1.0% Finance & Insurance; .4% Information; .4% Other Services; .2% Real Estate & Rental & Leasing and .2% Transportation & Warehousing.

Trinity Steel Fabricators, Inc.
Trinity Steel Fabricators was founded in 1976 by the Karnes family.  In 2013 the company moved its headquarters to Houston, Texas.  In 2014 the company acquired United Steel Fabricators, Inc., a structural steel fabrication facility in Trinity, Texas.

Avalon Place Nursing Home
Avalon Place has a rating of 2 stars based on the health inspection, staffing, and quality measures ratings combined into one.  The 118 bed nursing home is owned by Southwest LTC Trinity, Ltd, a for profit partnership.

Higginbotham Brothers
Higginbotham Brothers is a hardware and sporting goods chain serving Texas since 1881. The company acquired Wilkison Hardware & Furniture in July 2017.

Trinity Rehabilitation and Healthcare Center
Trinity Rehabilitation and Healthcare Center has a rating of 1 star based on the health inspection, staffing, and quality measures ratings combined into one. The 76 bed nursing home is owned by Trinity Rhc LLC, a for profit - limited liability company.

Infrastructure

Fire Department
Organized February 14, 1914, the Trinity Volunteer Fire Department began with 12 volunteers, 500 feet of hose, a shotgun and "some mighty strong lungs."  When a fire broke out, one member would fire the shotgun and the rest would start yelling.  Today TVFD members have advanced firefighting certification from the State Firemen's and Fire Marshal's Association.

Healthcare
CHI St. Luke's Health-Memorial Clinics opened an outpatient clinic Monday, August 7, 2017 in Trinity. CHI St. Luke's Health-Memorial officially signed a management service agreement with the Trinity Memorial Hospital District Board and its outpatient clinic. Hospital has yet to open back up.

Post Office
 The post office was established February 28, 1872, with the appointment of Samuel Robb as postmaster.  Construction of the current building was finished in August 1941, with Congressman Nat Patton as a keynote speaker during the opening ceremony.

Notable people

 Linda Ellerbee, journalist, spent a significant amount of time with her grandmother in Trinity as a youth
 William Goyen, novelist, born in Trinity April 24, 1915, whose first novel is somewhat based on the town
 Rebert H. Harris, Gospel Singer, born in Trinity, March 23, 1916, original founding member of the Soul Stirrers gospel group.
 Ollie Matson, NFL Hall of Fame halfback, born in Trinity, May 1, 1930
 Charlie Wilson, Texas politician

Notes

References

External links

 City of Trinity
 
 Trinity High School Alumni
 Trinity Historical Society
 Blanche K Werner Public Library
 Texas State Historical Association
 Trinity 1909 Sanborn Map Company

Gallery

Cities in Trinity County, Texas
Cities in Texas
Populated places established in 1872
1872 establishments in Texas